Lajos Jekelfalussy (1 October 18481911) was a Hungarian military officer and politician, who served as Minister of Defence between 1906 and 1910. His grandfather was József Jekelfalussy, royal chamberlain.

References
 Magyar Életrajzi Lexikon

Hungarian soldiers
1848 births
1911 deaths
Defence ministers of Hungary